Articles on Steam technology include:

 Advanced steam technology
 Boiler
 List of steam technology patents
 Steam engine
 Water-tube boiler 
 Supercritical steam generator